The Amtsberge are a small ridge of hills, up to , near Dassel in southern Lower Saxony in Germany.

Geography 
The densely wooded ridge of the Amtsberge is located on the boundary between the districts of Northeim (which is home to the larger part of the Amtsberge) and Holzminden (which contains the northwestern portion of the Amtsberge) and also on the boundary between the Leine Uplands to the east and the Weser Uplands to the west. It lies northeast of the Solling range between Stadtoldendorf in the northwest, the Homburg Forest in the north-northwest, the Elfas to the north-northeast, Dassel to the south and the ridge of Holzberg to the west, from which it is only separated by the little valley of the Teichbach stream. 

Several streams rise within the Amtsberge that are tributaries of the rivers Weser and Leine. The northwestern foothills of the Amtsberge are passed by the upper reaches of the River Lenne (an eastern tributary of the Weser) flowing northwest. The southern end of the hills is passed by the middle reaches of the Spüligbach (northwestern tributary of the Ilme) heading southeast. To the east are the middle reaches of the Bewer.

Hills 
Amongst the hills of the Amtsberge are the following − sorted by height in metres above sea level (NN): 

 Belzer Berg (392.2 m) *
 Hatop (370.4 m)
 Teichklippe (up to 350 m)
 Wendeberg (343.6 m)
 Heimkenberg (320.4 m)
 Hill crowned by Hunnesrück castle ruins (317.0 m)
 Rothenberg (270 m)

* a trigonometric point (at 375.6 m) lies on the northwest slope of the Belzer Berg

Streams and rivers 
Amongst the streams and rivers in and around the Amtsberge are the: 
 Bewer (northwestern tributary of the Ilme)
 Lenne (eastern tributary of the Weser)
 Reißbach (western tributary of the Bewer)
 Spüligbach (northwestern tributary of the Ilme)
 Teichbach (northern tributary of the Spüligbach)

Places 
Places in and on the Amtsberge: 
 Dassel – to the south
 Heinade – to the west
 Stadtoldendorf – to the northwest
 Wangelnstedt – to the north

Places of interest 
Apart from the charm of its woods, the places of interest in the Amtsberge include the Teichklippe crags, that are located on the ridge between Mackensen and Denkiehausen, and the ruins of Hunnesrück Castle, that lie south of the ridge north of Dassel and between Mackensen and Hunnesrück.

References 

Central Uplands
Ridges of Lower Saxony
Forests and woodlands of Lower Saxony
Natural regions of the Weser-Leine Uplands